Filippos Aristovoulos (romanized: Fílippos Aristóvoulos) was an Ottoman Greek scholar and Caloyer.

Biography 
He was born in 1832 in Neapolis, then Ottoman Empire (now Nevşehir, Turkey). He graduated from the Phanar Greek Orthodox College and the Theological School of Halki, from where he received his degree in 1856. He returned to his hometown, Neapolis, where he taught for 40 years, both as a layman and a monk. He promoted and struggled for the rights of the local Cappadocian Greeks on the governing board of the province, and for this reason he was respected by the locals. He died in August 1903 in Neapolis.

Works 
Some of his notable works are the following:
 Translation to Cappadocian Greek the work of Leon Melas, Gerostáthis (Γεροστάθης)
 Μoral speeches of the apostolic cuts on Sundays and
 the Ekklisiastikín Alítheia (Εκκλησιαστικήν Αλήθεια) or in English the Ecclesiastical Truth, which included the biography of Metropolitan Chalepios Theoktistos, who was his patron.

References 

1832 births
1903 deaths
Greeks from the Ottoman Empire
Cappadocian Greeks
People from Nevşehir
Greek scholars
Greek Christian monks
19th-century Greek educators